Jesper Svensson may refer to:
 Jesper Svensson (footballer) (born 1990), Swedish footballer
 Jesper Svensson (bowler) (born 1995), Swedish ten-pin bowler